Donald John Gross (June 30, 1931 – August 10, 2017) was an American baseball player whose 13-year professional career (1950–52; 1954–63) included all or parts of six seasons of Major League Baseball with the Cincinnati Redlegs (1955–57) and Pittsburgh Pirates (1958–60). He attended Michigan State University.

Gross was signed by the Cincinnati Reds as an amateur free agent and began his professional career in 1950 in their farm system. His professional career was put on hold in 1953 due to military service. Resuming professional baseball in 1954, he was promoted to the major leagues in 1955 making his debut on July 21 against the Philadelphia Phillies.

Gross appeared in 145 games over his MLB career, including 37 games as a starting pitcher. Overall, he won 20 of 42 decisions (.476), striking out 230 batters and giving up 400 hits in 398 innings of work. His career earned run average was 3.73. He had a stellar record in minor league baseball, compiling a won-lost record of 68–39.

After the 1957 season, Gross was traded to the Pirates for right-handed pitcher Bob Purkey. Gross went 6–8 (3.82) in 66 games for the Pirates, while Purkey went on to become a three-time National League All-Star, winning 103 games for Cincinnati over seven seasons, including a 23–5 (2.81) campaign in 1962.

Gross died August 10, 2017, at 86 years old.

References

External links

1931 births
2017 deaths
Baseball players from Michigan
Charleston Senators players
Cincinnati Redlegs players
Columbia Reds players
Columbus Jets players
Havana Sugar Kings players
Macon Peaches players
Major League Baseball pitchers
Michigan State Spartans baseball players
Muncie Reds players
Nashville Vols players
Ogden Reds players
Pittsburgh Pirates players
Salt Lake City Bees players
Syracuse Chiefs players
Tulsa Oilers (baseball) players
Welch Miners players
People from Isabella County, Michigan
American expatriate baseball players in Cuba